Hetauda is a sub-metropolitan city in the Makwanpur District of  Bagmati Province in central Nepal. It is the administrative headquarters of the Makwanpur District and the capital of Bagmati Province as declared by majority (105 out of 110) Provincial Assembly Members on 12 January 2020. It is one of the largest cities of Nepal. At the time of the 2015 Nepal census, it had a population of 153,875 people. The city had a population of 195,951 in 2021.

History 

It is believed that Hetauda got its name from Hidimba, a demonic queen who ended up marrying Bhimsen as per a story in Mahabharat. The fact that there is a place called Bhimphedi just as the plains of Hetauda meets the mountains can be considered a manifestation of this belief. During the Rana regime in Nepal, there has been a history of cars being carried by porters to Kathmandu through Bhimphedi.

Economy
The Hetauda Industrial District (HID) is one of the biggest industrial districts in Nepal, housing large, medium-scale, and cottage industry. It was established in 1963 under technical and financial assistance of the government of United States of America.

Demographics

Caste and Ethnic groups 

The single largest caste or ethnic groups in the city are Tamang , who makes (31%) of the population. While the largest ethnic groups are khas whose various caste groups combined makes (47%) of the population, Other ethnic groups in Hetauda  includes the Newar (9%), Magar (4%), and others various caste and ethnic groups makes(12%) of the population.

Languages 

At the time of the 2011 Census of Nepal, 62% of the population in the district spoke Nepali, 26% Tamang, 5% Newari, 2% Bhojpuri, and 3% spoke other languages as their first language.

Attractions
One of the most popular attractions of Hetauda is Martyr Memorial Park, or Sahid Smarak (Nepali: शहीद स्मारक), which was completed in 1994. The park honors Nepalese martyrs, from those who died in the British colonial wars to those who overthrew the autocratic Panchayat system in 1989. A series of sculptures of these martyrs sit on a large boulder; their faces were sculpted by student volunteers from Lalit Kala Campus. The park is also popular as a picnic spot and as an escape from busy city life. It has a swimming pool and a zoo that houses some endangered and some common wild animals, from monkeys to leopards.

Education
Education in Hetauda started with the establishment of Shree Bhutan Devi Secondary School (now Shree Bhutan Devi Higher Secondary School).  Some notable education institutions and University include:
 Makwanpur Multiple Campus
 Hetauda School Of Management
 Hetauda City College Zenith
 Narayani College
 Hetauda Campus

See also

 Kathmandu
 Pokhara
 Butwal
 Biratnagar
 Birgunj

References

External links
 Hetauda Municipality

Populated places in Makwanpur District
Nepal municipalities established in 1969
Submetropolitan municipalities of Nepal
Nepalese capital cities